Bogue Homo is a stream in the U.S. state of Mississippi. It is a tributary to the Chickasawhay River.

Name
Bogue Homo is a name derived from the Choctaw language meaning "red creek". Variant names are"Bogue Homa Creek" and "Bogue Homer".

References

Rivers of Mississippi
Rivers of Clarke County, Mississippi
Mississippi placenames of Native American origin